Valerie Clacio Weigmann (born March 13, 1990) is a Filipino-German actress, TV Host, fashion model, and beauty pageant titleholder of Danish descent who was crowned Miss World Philippines 2014. She represented the Philippines at the Miss World 2014 pageant held in London, England and finished as a Top 25 semifinalist.

She first gained popularity from appearing as one of the Pinoy Big Brother: Teen Edition Plus housemates and became a household name as a co-host of the Philippines' longest-running noontime variety show, Eat Bulaga!.

Early life and education
Weigmann is of Filipino, German and Danish descent born in Wiesbaden, Hesse, West Germany.

Her father was a German chef and her mother is a Filipino (née Clacio) from Albay.

Weigmann graduated at Werner-von-Siemens Realschule, Wiesbaden.

Weigmann co-owns Manila's first German-Turkish restaurant named, bamm located at The Collective, in Makati.

On May 2017, she was engaged to her businessman-lawyer boyfriend, Bodie Pulido.

Pageantry

Miss World Philippines 2014
On October 12, 2014, Weigmann joined Miss World Philippines 2014 and won succeeding Megan Young.

On October 18, 2015, Weigmann crowned Hillarie Parungao as her successor at the Miss World Philippines 2015 pageant held at the Solaire Resort & Casino in Parañaque, Philippines.

Miss World 2014
As Miss World Philippines, Weigmann represented the Philippines at the Miss World 2014 pageant in London, United Kingdom where she finished as a Top 25 semifinalist.

Career

Pinoy Big Brother
In 2008, Weigmann was chosen to be one of the housemates on the second teen edition of Pinoy Big Brother.

After PBB
After her stint in the PBB, she went on to appear on various television programs on ABS-CBN and was also tapped by several Manila-based modeling agencies for fashion assignments such as TV commercials, magazine spreads and runway.

In 2013, she was cast in the primetime series of TV5, Kidlat starring Derek Ramsay.

The following year, she was added as one of the new co-presenters of the noontime show of GMA Network, Eat Bulaga! and debuted in the "All For Juan, Juan For All segment.

Filmography

Television

Films

Notes

References

External links
 

 

1989 births
Living people
Filipino film actresses
Miss World Philippines winners
Miss World 2014 delegates
Pinoy Big Brother contestants
Filipino female models
Filipino restaurateurs
Filipino television actresses
People from Wiesbaden